Thomas Glass (c. 1864 – 17 May 1911) was an Australian politician.

Born in Geelong to police sergeant William Glass and Eliza Ann Dalton, he was educated at Bendigo and worked for stock and station agents, as a storeman in a grocery and as a librarian. An ardent supporter of Federation, he was active in the Australian Natives' Association, serving as director from 1900 and chief president in 1905. On 12 June 1907 he married Kate Pratt Hall. In 1907 he was elected to the Victorian Legislative Assembly as the Labor member for Bendigo East, serving until his death in Melbourne in 1911.

References

Year of birth uncertain
1911 deaths
Members of the Victorian Legislative Assembly
Politicians from Geelong
Australian librarians
Australian Labor Party members of the Parliament of Victoria